The La Mesa Dam and Reservoir  is an earth dam in Quezon City, Philippines. It is part of the Angat-Ipo-La Mesa water system, which supplies most of the water supply of Metro Manila.

History

The La Mesa Dam was constructed in 1929 during the United States administration of the Philippines. Sometime between 1920 and 1926, the Metropolitan Water District (a predecessor agency of the Metropolitan Waterworks and Sewerage System) decided to build a replacement for the old Wawa Dam in Montalban, Rizal. The Wawa Dam which serves Manila and surrounding locales had to be replaced due to the growing population of the Manila area.

The La Mesa was built in Novaliches, which was then still part of the municipality of Caloocan due to the sloping topography of the watershed area from Bulacan. The La Mesa dam later became part of a larger dam system with the opening of the Ipo Dam in Norzagaray, Bulacan in 1936, the Angat Dam in the same locale in 1967. The three dams formed part of the Angat-Ipo-La Mesa water system.

The La Mesa Dam was raised in 1959 to increase the reservoir's maximum capacity to its current level.

Dam

Reservoir
Water from the reservoir spills into the Tullahan River which transports the water to Manila Bay.

Administration
The La Mesa Watershed Reservation which hosts the dam and reservoir is jointly administered, supervised, and controlled by the Department of Environment and Natural Resources of the Philippine national government and the is under the joint administration, supervision and control of the (DENR) and the Metropolitan Waterworks and Sewerage System (MWSS).

Water supply

The La Mesa Dam is part of the Angat-Ipo-La Mesa water system which supplies water to the population of Metro Manila and surrounding provinces.

The water collected in the reservoir is treated at the La Mesa and Balara Treatment Plants. The La Mesa facility has a design capacity of 2,400 million litters per day (mld) while the Balara facility has a capacity of 1,600 mld. The La Mesa treatment facility serves the western half of Metro Manila while the Balara facility serves the eastern portion of the metropolis.

Whenever the water level of the dam drops below  or the critical mark, the MWSS, Maynilad, and Manila Water begin to regulate the water supply they dispense to their patrons.

See also
 List of lakes in the Philippines

References

External links
 Angat-Ipo-La Mesa System from Manila Water Company
 La Mesa Watershed and Eco-Park

Dams in the Philippines
Buildings and structures in Quezon City
Water supply and sanitation in Metro Manila